The Ministry of Health is a cabinet-level government ministry of Uganda. It is responsible for planning, delivering, and maintaining an efficient and effective healthcare delivery system, including preventive, curative, and rehabilitative services, in a humane, affordable, and sustainable manner. The ministry is headed by Minister of Health Jane Aceng.

Location
The coordinates of the building are 0°19'59.0"N, 32°34'39.0"E (Latitude:0.333044; Longitude:32.577486).

Subministries
 State Minister for Health (General Duties)
 State Minister for Primary Healthcare - Joyce Moriku.

List of ministers
 Jane Aceng (6 June 2016 - present)
 Elioda Tumwesigye (1 March 2015 - 6 June 2016)
 Vacant (18 September 2014 - 1 March 2015)
 Ruhakana Rugunda (23 May 2013 - 18 September 2014)
 Christine Ondoa (27 May 2011 - 23 May 2013)
 Stephen Mallinga (1 June 2006 - 27 May 2011)
Jim Muhwezi (2001 - 1 June 2006)

 Henry Kyemba, 1970s

See also

Politics of Uganda
List of hospitals in Uganda

References

External links
 

Health
Uganda
Organisations based in Kampala